Anastasious "Tom" Koutsantonis is an Australian politician in the South Australian Branch of the Australian Labor Party, representing the seats of West Torrens (2002−current) and Peake (1997−2002) as a Labor member in the South Australian House of Assembly.

He served as Treasurer of South Australia and minister for other portfolios in the Weatherill cabinet between 2011 and 2018. Since March 2022 Koutsantonis has served as the Minister for Infrastructure and Transport and the Minister for Energy and Mining in the Malinauskas ministry.

Background
A Greek-Australian, Koutsantonis was born in Adelaide and attended Netley Primary School and Adelaide High School. As a student at the University of Adelaide he became involved in Australian Young Labor, drove taxis and went on to run a small business before becoming an industrial officer for the Shop, Distributive and Allied Employees Association (SDA) in the 1990s.

Parliament
Koutsantonis was elected to the seat of Peake (now West Torrens) at the 1997 election on a margin of 4.5 points, then by 8.6 points at the 2002 election, and by 18.3 points at the 2006 election, after which Koutsantonis was elevated to the chairmanship of the economic and advisory committee.

In 2009, he was appointed to cabinet; Koutsantonis has served in a range of ministerial portfolios with responsibility for finance, state development, mineral resources and energy, small business, ministerial resources and energy, and for road safety, where Koutsantonis was forced to apologise for his "unacceptable" driving record which listed 58 traffic offences and over $10,000 in fines. He subsequently resigned the road safety portfolio.

Following the retirement of Liberal's Rob Lucas at the 2022 state election, which Labor won, Koutsantonis became the longest serving member of the South Australian Parliament. His long-serving parliamentary service was recognised by Labor leader Peter Malinauskas in his victory speech on election night. After the election, Malinauskas appointed Koutsantonis as Minister for Infrastructure and Transport and Minister for Energy and Mining.

References

External links
Parliamentary Profile: SA Labor website

|-

Members of the South Australian House of Assembly
Labor Right politicians
Australian people of Greek descent
1971 births
Living people
Treasurers of South Australia
21st-century Australian politicians
Politicians from Adelaide
People educated at Adelaide High School